Linus Högberg (born 4 September 1998) is a Swedish professional ice hockey defenceman currently with Skellefteå AIK in the Swedish Hockey League (SHL). He has formerly played with the Philadelphia Flyers of the National Hockey League (NHL).

Playing career
Högberg made his professional debut during the 2015–16 season with the Växjö Lakers of the Swedish Hockey League (SHL). Högberg was subsequently drafted in the fifth round of the 2016 NHL Entry Draft, 139th overall, by the Philadelphia Flyers. 

On 31 May 2020, he was signed to a three-year, entry-level contract with the Philadelphia Flyers.

During the 2022–23 season, Högberg was re-assigned and remained in the AHL with the Phantoms. Unable to earn a recall to the NHL, after making only 19 appearances with the Phantoms, he was placed on unconditional waivers by the Flyers in order to mutually terminate the remainder of his contract on 9 February 2023. In returning to Sweden, Högberg was immediately signed by Skellefteå AIK of the SHL for the remainder of the season on 11 February 2023.

Career statistics

Regular season and playoffs

International

Awards and honours

References

External links
 

1998 births
Living people
HC Vita Hästen players
IF Björklöven players
Lehigh Valley Phantoms players
Philadelphia Flyers draft picks
Philadelphia Flyers players
Ice hockey people from Stockholm
Swedish ice hockey defencemen
Twin sportspeople
Swedish twins
Växjö Lakers players